Pseudocolaspis azurea is a species of leaf beetle of Senegal, described by Thomas Ansell Marshall in 1865.

References

Eumolpinae
Beetles of Africa
Beetles described in 1865
Taxa named by Thomas Ansell Marshall
Insects of West Africa